National Secondary Route 163, or just Route 163 (or ) is a National Road Route of Costa Rica, located in the Guanacaste, Puntarenas provinces.

Description
In Guanacaste province the route covers Nandayure canton (Bejuco district).

In Puntarenas province the route covers Puntarenas canton (Lepanto district).

References

Highways in Costa Rica